Oracle Grid Engine, previously known as Sun Grid Engine (SGE), CODINE (Computing in Distributed Networked Environments) or GRD (Global Resource Director), was a grid computing computer cluster software system (otherwise known as a batch-queuing system), acquired as part of a purchase of Gridware, then improved and supported by Sun Microsystems and later Oracle. There have been open source versions and multiple commercial versions of this technology, initially from Sun, later from Oracle and then from Univa Corporation.

On October 22, 2013 Univa announced it acquired the intellectual property and trademarks for the Grid Engine technology and that Univa will take over support. Univa has since evolved the Grid Engine technology, e.g. improving scalability as demonstrated by a 1 million core cluster in Amazon Web Services (AWS) announced on June 24, 2018.

The original Grid Engine open-source project website closed in 2010, but versions of the technology are still available under its original Sun Industry Standards Source License (SISSL). Those projects were forked from the original project code and are known as Son of Grid Engine, Open Grid Scheduler and Univa Grid Engine.

Grid Engine is typically used on a computer farm or high-performance computing (HPC) cluster and is responsible for accepting, scheduling, dispatching, and managing the remote and distributed execution of large numbers of standalone, parallel or interactive user jobs.  It also manages and schedules the allocation of distributed resources such as processors, memory, disk space, and software licenses.

Grid Engine used to be the foundation of the Sun Grid utility computing system, made available over the Internet in the United States in 2006, later becoming available in many other countries and having been an early version of a public cloud computing facility predating AWS, for instance.

History
In 2000, Sun acquired Gridware a privately owned commercial vendor of advanced computing resource management software with offices in San Jose, Calif., and Regensburg, Germany.  Later that year, Sun offered a free version of Gridware for Solaris and Linux, and renamed the product Sun Grid Engine.

In 2001, Sun made the source code available, and adopted the open source development model. Ports for Mac OS X and *BSD were contributed by the non-Sun open source developers.

In 2010, after the purchase of Sun by Oracle, the Grid Engine 6.2 update 6 source code was not included with the binaries, and changes were not put back to the project's source repository. In response to this, the Grid Engine community started the Open Grid Scheduler project to continue to develop and maintain a free implementation of Grid Engine.

On January 18, 2011, it was announced that Univa had recruited several principal engineers from the former Sun Grid Engine team and that Univa would be developing their own forked version of Grid Engine.  The newly announced Univa Grid Engine did include commercial support and would compete with the official version of Oracle Grid Engine.

On Oct 22, 2013 Univa has announced that it had acquired the intellectual property and trademarks pertaining to the Grid Engine technology and that Univa will take over support for Oracle Grid Engine customers.

In September 2020, Altair Engineering, a global technology company providing solutions in data analytics, product development, and high-performance computing (HPC) acquired Univa.

Cluster architecture 

A typical Grid Engine cluster consists of a master host and one or more execution hosts. Multiple shadow masters can also be configured as hot spares, which take over the role of the master when the original master host crashes.

Support and training
Univa is providing commercial support and training for Univa Grid Engine and Oracle Grid Engine. Below is a description of some of the historic options.

Sun provided support contracts 
for the commercial version of Grid Engine on most UNIX platforms and Windows. Professional services, consulting, training, and support were provided by Sun Partners. Sun partners with Georgetown University to deliver Grid Engine administration classes. The Bioteam runs short SGE training workshops that are 1 or 2 days long.

Users obtained community support on the Grid Engine mailing lists.
Grid Engine Workshops were held in 2002, 2003, 2007, 2009, and 2012 in Regensburg, Germany.

Other Grid Engine based products

The below contains historic information and some of the products and solutions are no longer available:

 Sun Constellation System
 Sun Visualization System
 Sun Compute Cluster
 ClusterVisionOS Distribution
 Rocks Cluster Distribution
 Univa's UniCluster Express
 Univa Grid Engine 
 Some Grid Engine  active free fork of Sge with "some" further modifications, Michigan Neuroscience Institute, University of Michigan (2021).
 Son of Grid Engine  inactive free fork of Sge with some enhancements, University of Liverpool, default Uubuntu/CentOS/RHEL gridengine package (2021). 
 BioTeam's iNquiry
 Nimbus  uses Grid Engine as a virtual machine scheduler in a cloud computing environment

See also

Sun Ops Center - Sun's datacenter automation tool
Open Grid Forum

References

Sun Microsystems software
Job scheduling
Parallel computing
Grid computing
Cross-platform software
Cluster computing
2001 software
Sun Microsystems acquisitions